Alessio Locatelli (born 17 March 1978) is an Italian football goalkeeper. Amongst the teams he played for are U.S. Pro Vercelli Calcio, Spezia Calcio and Botev.

Career
Locatelli signed with Botev for three years on 24 November 2008 but was quickly released for free for poor performances. He was given the №30 shirt. On 2 February 2009, he joined Sorrento along with Hodža.

References

External links
Profile at Soccer Mercato

1978 births
Living people
Italian footballers
Italian expatriate footballers
Association football goalkeepers
Sportspeople from the Metropolitan City of Milan
Botev Plovdiv players
First Professional Football League (Bulgaria) players
F.C. Pro Vercelli 1892 players
Footballers from Lombardy